Adeline Kh'ayàdê Webber is a member of the Teslin Tlingit First Nation and Kukhhittan Clan. Born and raised in Whitehorse, Yukon, Webber is a leader, advocate, volunteer, important community member and elder. She has worked in the federal public service, and has been extensively involved with land claims, First Nation self-government agreements, and Indigenous women’s rights in the territory. As the founder and former President of the Whitehorse Aboriginal Women’s Circle and as the Yukon District Director for the Public Service Commission of Canada, Webber's  continued work in employment and training for First Nations people has been implemented through several women’s leadership-training courses, as well as the Northern Careers Program.  Webber currently is the Administrator of Yukon Territory.

Early life 

Born and raised in Whitehorse, Yukon, Adeline Webber is of Inland Tlingit ancestry. At the age of five years old, Webber was taken from her home and placed at the Whitehorse Baptism Mission School (1947-1960). Although Webber and her sister, Winnie Peterson, stayed together, the residential school system separated her family members, sending her brothers to schools in Northern Alberta and Carcross. Following  seven years in residential school, Webber married her husband Bill Webber before landing her first job working in the kitchen and doing laundry in Yukon Hall, the residential school residence that later housed the Council of Yukon First Nations offices for more than ten years.

Career 

Adeline Webber's career spans over 30 years lobbying for Indigenous rights in the Yukon. Webber founded the Yukon Indian Women's Association in 1974 as a means to address the inequality Indigenous women faced in the territory. Today, the Whitehorse Aboriginal Women’s Circle (WAWC) exists as "a forum for Aboriginal women to socialize, network, support and address issues of common interest and concern." Webber later joined the Federal public service as the Yukon District Director for the Public Service Commission of Canada In this role, Webber developed the Northern Careers Program, which aimed to educate and assist all First Nations people with seeking employment opportunities in government at the federal level. This program continues to see its impact as many participants continue to work in senior government positions today. Webber also developed a Training Policy Committee and Training Trust program which set aside and distributed monies so that First Nations people could be trained. Webber's work in human resources was also realized in the form of a human resource plan for both territorial and federal governments, which was developed in consultation with the Yukon Government and First Nations. Webber was a force when it came to the implementation of land claims and First Nation self-government agreements in the territory. As a leader in the Teslin Tlingit Council community, Webber has advocated for the finalization of the Teslin Tlingit Council Final and Self-Government Agreements, falling under the negotiation framework of the Umbrella Final Agreement. Webber is an honorary lifetime member of the Skookum Jim Friendship Centre due to her contributions as a board of directors in 1989 and president for ten years. Webber continues to be an active member of her community. Today, as the Administrator of Yukon Territory, Webber acts in the place of the Commissioner of Yukon Territory if they are unable to fulfill their duties during an absence. Prime Minister Justin Trudeau stated of Webber on March 9, 2018: “Adeline Webber has dedicated much of her career to public service and has proven herself to be a champion of Indigenous Peoples. I know that the territory will benefit greatly from the experience and knowledge she will bring to the table as the Administrator of Yukon.”

Publications 

The book Finding our Faces consists of over sixty pages of photos and stories documenting the residential school system in Whitehorse. Working with archivist Melissa Carlick, Webber sought funding from the Anglican Church Fund and Yukon Government to develop this record of the Whitehorse Baptist Mission School. Webber has said that this project documents "my history for my children and grandchildren," and ultimately may be used as a resource for schools to learn of a formerly undocumented history.

Awards 
Canada125 Commemorative Medal; Queen’s Diamond Jubilee; Yukon Commissioner’s Award for Public Service and Skookum Jim Friendship Centre Service Award

References 

Year of birth missing (living people)
Living people
20th-century First Nations people
21st-century First Nations people
Indigenous leaders in Canada
Indigenous rights activists
Politicians from Whitehorse
Tlingit people
First Nations women in politics